Totonero 1986 or Totonero bis was a scandal of football match fixing in Italy between 1984 and 1986 in Serie A, Serie B, Serie C1 and Serie C2.

It was uncovered in May 1986 by Italian Police and Armando Carbone, a friend of Italo Allodi (manager of Napoli), and in this scandal there were managers and football players that sold the football matches for money.

Club punishments 
 Udinese (Serie A); -9 in Serie A 1986–87 (relegated in Serie B in original punishment).
 Cagliari (Serie B); -5 in Serie B 1986–87.
 Lazio (Serie B); -9 in Serie B 1986–87 (relegated in Serie C1 in original punishment).
 Lanerossi Vicenza (Serie B); exclusion from Serie A 1986–87.
 Triestina (Serie B); -1 in Serie B 1985–86 and -4 in Serie B 1986–87.
 Perugia (Serie B); relegated in Serie C2 and -2 in 1986–87 (relegated in Serie C2 and -5 in 1986–87 in original punishment).
 Palermo (Serie B); -5 in Serie B 1986–87.
 Foggia (Serie C1); -5 in Serie C1 1986–87 (relegated in Serie C2 in original punishment).
 Cavese (Serie C1); relegated in Serie C2 and -5 in 1986–87.

Sentences 
Presidents

 Guerino Amato (Cavese's president); 5 years with exclusion from FIGC.
  (Perugia's president); 5 years with exclusion from FIGC.
 Dario Mascharin (Vicenza's president); 3 years (5 years with exclusion from FIGC in original punishment).
 Salvatore Matta (Palermo's president); 4 months.
  (Ascoli's president); 4 months.

Managers and coaches
 Guido Magherini (Rondinella); 5 years with exclusion from FIGC.
  (Udinese); 5 years with exclusion from FIGC.
  (Sarnico); 3 years and 9 months (3 years and 3 months in original punishment).
 Ernesto Bronzetti (Foggia); 3 years (5 years with exclusion from FIGC in original punishment).
  (Pro Vercelli); 3 years.
  (Vicenza); 3 years.
 Renzo Ulivieri (Cagliari's coach); 3 years.
 Francesco Janich (Bari); 6 months (1 year in original punishment).
 Aldo Agroppi (Perugia's coach); 4 months.
 Onofrio Schillaci (Palermo); 4 months.
  (Vicenza); 4 months.
 Giorgio Vitali (Monza); 4 months.

Players
 Franco Cerilli (Vicenza); 5 years with exclusion from FIGC.
 Claudio Vinazzani (Lazio); 5 years with exclusion from FIGC.
 Giovanni Lorini (Monza); 5 years with exclusion from FIGC.
 Maurizio Rossi (Pescara); 5 years with exclusion from FIGC.
 Massimo Caccia (Messina); 5 years.
  (Palermo); 3 years and 1 month.
 Giovanni Vavassori (Campania-Puteolana); 3 years and 4 months (3 years in original punishment).
 Giovanni Bidese (Pro Vercelli); 3 years and 3 months (3 years in original punishment).
  (Triestina); 3 years.
  (Perugia); 3 years.
  (Palermo); 3 years.
 Giacomo Chinellato (Cagliari); 2 years.
  (Spal); 1 year and 6 months (3 years in original punishment).
 Alfio Filosofi (Virescit Bergamo); 6 months (1 year in original punishment).
 Onofrio Barone (Palermo); 5 months.
 Luigi Cagni (Sambenedettese); 4 months.
 Antonio Gasparini (Monza); 4 months.
 Mario Giudetti (Pro Vercelli); 4 months.
  (Brescia); 4 months.
  (Sambenedettese); 4 months.
  (Cesena); 4 months.
 Stefano Donetti (Martina Franca); 3 months.
 Silvano Benedetti (Palermo); 1 month.
 Tebaldo Bigliardi (Palermo); 1 month.
 Massimo Bursi (Palermo); 1 month.
 Gianni De Biasi (Palermo); 1 month.
  (Palermo); 1 month.
  (Palermo); 1 month.
  (Palermo); 1 month.
 Claudio Pellegrini (Palermo); 1 month.
  (Palermo); 1 month.
  (Palermo); 1 month.
 Mario Romiti (Barletta); 1 month.
 Orazio Sorbello (Palermo); 1 month.

Aftermath 

 Udinese and Cagliari were relegated from Serie A and Serie B, respectively, the following season. Udinese would have remained in Serie A if not for their point deduction, but Cagliari would have been relegated even without the penalty.

References 

Association football controversies
History of football in Italy
1985–86 in Italian football
Sports betting scandals
Sports scandals in Italy
1986–87 in Italian football
Match fixing